Gerhardine "Gerdy" Troost (née Andresen; 3 March 1904 – 30 January 2003), was a German architect interior designer and interior decorator and the wife of Paul Ludwig Troost.<ref>Hermann Weiß (Ed.): Biographisches Lexikon zum „Dritten Reich“. Fischer-Taschenbuch-Verlag, Frankfurt am Main 2002,  (Fischer 13086 Die Zeit des Nationalsozialismus).</ref>

 Life and work 
Troost was born in Stuttgart, the daughter of the architect Johannes Andresen. After completing her education, she worked in her father's business, where she met Paul Ludwig Troost in 1923. In 1924, the pair moved to Munich and were married there in 1925. Through her husband, she became acquainted with Adolf Hitler in 1930 and became a member of the Nazi Party in 1932.

After her husband's death in 1934, Troost ran his architectural and design business together with his former partner, Leonhard Gall. She supervised the construction of the Haus der Kunst, the remodeling of the Königsplatz, and the construction of the Ehrentempels.

Troost was responsible for the interior renovations of Hitler's official and private residences during the Third Reich, including the Old Chancellery in Berlin, the Berghof on the Obersalzberg, and his Munich apartment.

She remained an architectural and design adviser to Hitler's circle up to the end of the war. In 1943, she received from Hitler an endowment of 100,000 Reichsmarks. Troost was one of the few people who actively disagreed with Hitler without fear of being fired or arrested. Hitler listened to Troost about art and architecture.

During denazification she was classified as "less responsible" (Minderbelastete) by the Hauptspruchkammer and sentenced to a fine of 500 DM and a 10-year Berufsverbot. At the end of the period, Troost resumed work and resided in Schützing, a town on the Chiemsee in Upper Bavaria.

Gerdy Troost remained a friend and confidante of Winifred Wagner after 1945. She died in Bad Reichenhall at the age of 98 on 30 January 2003.

 Citations 

Further reading
 Stratigakos, Despina. (2015). Hitler at Home. Yale University Press - analyzing Troost's interior design

In popular culture
 Troost is an important and sympathetic character in Philip Kerr's historical thriller Prussian Blue, set in 1939 and part of Kerr's Bernie Gunther series.

 References 
 Sabine Brantl: Haus der Kunst München. Ein Ort und seine Geschichte im Nationalsozialismus. Allitera Verlag, München 2007,  (Edition Monacensia).

 External links 
 
 Full text of Troost's book Das Bauen im Neuen Reich 1. Band''
 Entry in the Union List of Artist Names
 The American Media's Awkward Fawning Over Hitler's Taste in Home Decor - Atlas Obscura

1904 births
2003 deaths
Nazi architecture
20th-century German architects
Nazi Party members
German women architects
Architects from Stuttgart